Ham Mill Halt was opened on 12 October 1903 on what is now the Golden Valley Line between Kemble and . This line was opened in 1845 as the Cheltenham and Great Western Union Railway from Swindon to Gloucester and this was one of many small stations and halts built on this line for the local passenger service.

The halt consisted of a wooden crossing and a pair of platforms, each with GWR pagoda style shelters. Electric lighting was installed 1939 at an estimated cost of £108. Electric treadles and bells were provided either side of the crossing to warn passengers of trains approaching.

Closure of the halt came in November 1964 following the withdrawal of local stopping passenger services on the line. No trace of the halt remains today.

Services
This halt was served by the Gloucester to Chalford local passenger services, known as the Chalford Auto.

References

Stroud District
Disused railway stations in Gloucestershire
Former Great Western Railway stations
Railway stations in Great Britain opened in 1903
Railway stations in Great Britain closed in 1964
Beeching closures in England